Ayal Adler, is an Israeli composer. Active internationally, his works are continuously performed worldwide. Serves as Associate Professor in composition and theory at the Jerusalem Academy of Music and Dance. Recipient of numerous awards, including: the Prime-Minister Award for Composition; Two Acum Prizes (equivalent to ASCAP), and the first prize at the RMN International Competition in London. Serves as a Board member of the Israeli Composers' League.

Biography
Ayal Adlerr's compositions were performed in recent years in the United States; Canada; Germany; Austria; England; Lithuania; Spain; Finland; Czech Republic; Russia; Hungary; Croatia; South Korea, and more.  Adler's oeuvre includes music in various genres including solo, chamber, vocal, and orchestral. His recent work, In Motion - Concerto for Continuo and Large Orchestra will be premiered at the Bregenz Festival in July 2023, with Omer Meir Wellber (cond./ Harpsichord/ Accordion) and the Wiener Symphoniker. Resonating Sounds for Large Orchestra was commissioned and premiered by Daniel Barenboim and the West- Eastern DIVAN Orchestra, at the following venues: BBC Proms, Royal Albert Hall; Lucerne Festival; Salzburg Festival; Colon Theatre, Buenos Aires. His song cycle, Alone, I return from the Night was commissioned and premiered by the Munich Philharmonic, cond. by Omer Meir Wellber, with soprano Hila Baggio. Crystallization for Large Orchestra was re-premiered by Zubin Mehta and the Israeli Philharmonic. Postlude for Large Ensemble was re= premiered by Matthias Pintscher and Meitar Ensemble. Ayal Adler's works are often performed at International Festivals, such as the International Society of Contemporary Music (ISCM); Jerusalem International Chamber Music Festival; Asian Composers' League (ACL), and more. In Israel, his music was premiered, among others, by The Israel Philharmonic Orchestra; Israel Camerata Orchestra Jerusalem; Israel Symphony Orchestra; Jerusalem Symphony Orchestra; Meitar Ensemble; Israel Contemporary Soloists; Raanana Symphonette Orchestra; Tel Aviv Soloists Ensemble, and more, under the baton of Omer Meir Wellber; Matthias Pintscher; Ilan Volkov; Frédéric Chaslin; Pierre-André Valade; Zsolt Nagy, and others. 

Ayal Adler was born in Jerusalem. After receiving a Diploma in Piano and Composition from the Rubin Jerusalem Conservatory, he enrolled at the Jerusalem Academy of Music and Dance. There, he completed a B.Mus. and an Artist Diploma in Composition (with Honors). He then pursued a Doctoral degree in Composition at McGill University in Montreal. Ayal Adler is a full-time faculty at the Jerusalem Academy of Music and Dance, and serves as an Assocaite Professor in Composition and Theory. In recent years he held various academic positions, such as Chair, Composition and Conducting Faculty, Dean of Students, and others. He currently serves as a Board member of the Israeli Composers' League (ICL).  

Recipient of numerous awards and grants, including: First Prize at the International Composition Competition RMN Music in London, 2018, for his work Chase; Prime- Minister Award for Composers (2008); Two ACUM Prizes: Achievement Award of the Year Award for Quintet (2012), and orchestral award for Crystallization (2003); Commissions from the America-Israel Cultural Fund, including a Fulbright Grant for Doctoral Studies; Commmisions from the Adele and John Gray Endowment Fund, and others. Mr. Adler was nominated Composer-in-Residence for the Meitar ensemble from 2006 -2012, and later on became the Ensemble's Advisor. Six compact discs containing his works were released in recent years. His works are regularly published by the Israeli Music Institute (IMI), and the Israeli Music Center (IMC). Ayal Adler's works were recorded and played on BBC Radio 4; Radio Swiss; Radio France; Israeli Radio Kan HaMusica, and others.

Website: http://ayaladler.com/

Compositions
 In Motion- Concerto for Continuo and Large Orchestra (2022- 2023). 20 min.
 Shades, for Violin, Violincello, and Piano (2022). 10 min. 
 Transparent Lights, for Violin and Viilincello ( 2022). 8 min.
 Imaginary Figures, for Piano (2020). 11 min 
 Hidden Light, for large ensemble (2020). 13 min. 
 Alone, I return from the Night.Three songs and Interludes for Soprano and Large Orchestra (2019). 18 min. 
 Circular Breathing,for String orchestra (2018/2021). 15 min
 Lines, interrupted, for Violin and strings (2019). 14 min
 Rock Expressions for Guitars and ensemble (2016). 15 min
 Double Concerto for Single Guitarist and large orchestra (2016). 15 min
 Concerto for Mandolin and strings (2015).14 min
 Misterioso (2015) for piano. 8'.  
 Resonating Sounds, for large orchestra (2014/2018). 17 min
 Colors of Dust, for fl, cl, vn, vc, pno (2013). 14 min
 Solitary, I return from the night (2012). Three songs for soprano and orchestra. Texts: David Vogel. 15 min
 Postlude, for a large ensemble (2011). 10'.
 Allegretto Misterioso, for Two Pianos (2011). 10'. 
 For Four, Piano 4 Hand (2015). 8'
 Two Short Pieces for piano (2010). 7'. 
 Quintet for pno, fl, cl, vn and vc (2009). 15'. 
 Or Haganuz, for a large ensemble (2008). 14'. 
 At the Gate of Darkness (2006), two songs for mezzo-soprano, fl, cl, bsn, vn, vc and pno. Texts: David Vogel: As night approaches; At the gate of Darkness. 14'. 
 Reminiscence (2005) for violin and piano. 18'. 
 Circles in Time (2004) for fl, cl, vc, prc and pno. 14'. 
 Shades.. to Colors (2003) for piano and string quartet. 12'. 
 Crystallization (2001) for large orchestra. 17'. 
 Voyages (1999) for orchestra. 10'. 
 Dialogues (1998) for piano and large ensemble (12 players). 14'. 
 Largo (1997) for violin and orchestra. 14'. 
 Two Pieces for piano(1996): Allegro Agitato; Andante Sostenuto. 10'. -
 String Quartet (1995) in four movements. 14'.                      
 Five Short Pieces for Clarinet (1995). 10'. 
 Three Songs for Women's Choir (1994): Kirya Yefeifia; Se'I Yona; Nitzanim Nir'u Ba'aretz. 13'.

Public Performances (partial list) 
 Imaginary Figures. Amit Dolberg, piano. Israel Music Days, December 2020, Tel Aviv Museum.* Hidden Light, for large ensemble. New version premiere. UMZE ensemble, Gregory Vajda, cond. Budapest Music Center, October 2020  
 Alone, I return from the Night for soprano and large orchestra.premiere. Hila Baggio, soprano, Munich Philharmonic, Omer Meir Wellber, cond. November 2019, Munich 
 Voyages for orchestra. Intrada Contemporary Music Festival, opening concert, November 2019: Timisoara, Romania
 Colors of dust for fl, cl, vln, vc, pno. Moscow Soloits Ensemble. October 2019: Moscow and Kazan
 Nuances de Colours, for string quartet. Premiere. Farma quartet, Hamakom Festival, Holesov, Czech Republic. July 2019 
 Fragmented Lines in Time, for woodwind quartet, diX Ensemble. June–July 2019, Premiere: 
-Nemtzov Gallery, Berlin; Großschwabhausen concert house, Weimar
 Misterioso for piano. Amit Dolberg .  May 2019, Tel Aviv Museum 
Lines, Interrupted, Concerto for Violin and Strings. Itamar Zorman, violin, Tel Aviv Soloists Ensemble, Barak Tak, cond. May 2019: 
-Israeli Conservatory Hall, Tel Aviv; Weiss Hall, Jerusalem 
Shades, for piano quartet. Ensemble Wiener Collage, Rene Staar, cond.  Arnold Schoenberg Center, Vienna March 2019
Colors of Dust for quintet. Meitar Ensemble, Pierre- Andre Vallade, cond. Festival- Biennale of New Music, Florida State University. February 2019
Shades, for piano quartet. Ensemble Wiener Collage, Rene Staar, cond.  Clairmont Hall, Tel Aviv. December 2018
Misterioso for piano. Amit Dolberg, piano.  Leipzig University. December 2018
Contrasts in Time, for solo Violin. Karen Bentley- Pollick, violin, Stanford University. May 2018
Postlude for large ensemble. Zeutfluss Ensemble, Edo Micic, cond. Arnold Schoenberg Center, Vienna. May 2018
Circular Breathing, for string orchestra- Premiere. St. Christopher Chamber Orchestra, Modestas Barkauskas, cond. St. Catherine's Church (Vilnius St 30), Vilnius, Lithuania. April 2018
Misterioso for piano. Amit Dolberg, piano, Macedonian International Festival, Philharmonic Hall, Skopje, Macedonia. April 2018 
Colors of Dust for quintet. Meitar Ensemble, Constantia Gorcki, cond. Tel Aviv Conservatory, March 2018
Misterioso for piano. Amit Dolberg, piano, Gare du Nord Festival, Basel, Switzerland, March 2018 
Misterioso for piano, Amit Dolberg, piano. Intrada New Music Festival, Timișoara, Romania, November 2017
Solitary, I return from the night, three songs for soprano and orchestra. Texts: David Vogel. The Israel Camerata Jerusaelm, Uriel Segal, cond. Israeli Music Days, Tel Aviv Museum, September 2017
Misterioso for piano, Hagai Yudan, piano. Tel Aviv Conservatory, September 2017
Lines, Interrupted, Concerto for Violin and Strings. Tomas Tulacek, Violin, 
Mosheles Strings Ensemble, Jan Rezek, cond. Smetana Museum, Prague, May 2017
Lines, Interrupted, Concerto for Violin and Strings. Tomas Tulacek, Violin, 
Mosheles Strings Ensemble, Barak Tal, cond. November 2016. Premiere: – Janáček Academy Hall, Brno
Rock Expressions, for Guitars and Ensemble- Premiere. Nadav Lev, Guitars. Meitar Ensemble, Ziv Kozo, cond. October 2016, Premiere:
- Israeli Conservatory Ran baron Hall, Tel Aviv- International Classical, Guitar Festival, Netanya Cultural Hall
Contrasts in Time, for solo Violin. Karen Bentley- Pollick, violin,. September 2016. Premiere: Klaipeda, Lithuania Contemporary Festival- 
Spectrum New Music Series, New York-Winter Solstice concert in Seattle. December 2016- 
Double Concerto for Single Guitarist. Jerusalem Symphony Orchestra, Frederic Chaslin, cond. Nadav Lev, Guitars.  July 2016. Premiere:
Henry Crown Hall, Jerusalem-*Dialogues for Piano and Chamber Ensemble. Ensemble Meitar, Pierre Andre Vallade, cond. Amit Dolberg, piano. International CEME Festival. Revised Premiere: 
January 2016. Revised Premiere:   Israel Music Conservatory Hall, Tel Aviv-
Expanses- Concerto for Piano and String Orchestra.  Amit Dolberg, piano, Tel Aviv Soloists, Barak Tal, cond. September 2015:- Rappoport Center, Haifa, Hag Hamusika Festival 
Concerto for Mandolin and String Orchestra. Raanana Symphonette Orchestra, Omer Meir Wellber, cond. Yaakov Reuven, mandolin. June 2015. Premiere: – Auditorium Raanana
Colors of Dust for fl, cl, vn, vc and pno. Ensemble Meitar, Yuval Zorn, cond. March 2015:- 92 Street Y, New York- Banff Arts Center – New Music Series, Calgary
Resonating Sounds for large orchestra. Commissioned by Daniel Barenboim and West-Eastern Divan Orchestra. World Summer Tour, Premiere. August 2014:
- Lucerne Festival- BBC Proms, Royal Albert Hall, London- Salzburg Festival -Colon Theater, Buenos Aires 
Misterioso for Piano. Yuval Zorn, Piano. July 2014:-Royal Opera House, London-Steinway House, London- Hateiva, Tel Aviv
Expanses- Concerto for Piano and String Orchestra.  Amit Dolberg, piano, Tel Aviv Soloists,Barak Tal, cond. March 2014. Premiere:-Weiss Hall, Jerusalem -Tel Aviv Conservatory–Rappoport Center, Haifa Weil Center
Colors of Dust for fl, cl, vn, vc and pno. Roy Amotz- flute, Pascal Moragues- clarinet. Michael Barenboim- violin, Timothy Parks- cello. Yaron Kolberg- piano. Nir Cohen- cond.
September 2014: Jerusalem International Chamber Music Festival-
 Colors of Dust (2013) for fl, cl, vn, vc and pno. Roi Amotz- flute, Pascal Moragues- clarinet. Michael Barenboim- violin, Timothy Parks- cello. Yaron Kolberg- piano. David Coleman- cond. International Chamber Music Festival, September 2013, YMCA Jerusalem
 Quintet, Piano& Ensemble. Ensemble Meitar, Guy Feder, cond. May 2013: 
 Yale University. New Haven
 Johns Hopkins University, Dartmouth
 Chapelle Historique de Bon-Pasteur, Montreal
 Colors of Dust. Claudia Stain. Intonation Chamber Music Festival. Jewish Museum Berlin, May 2013. Premiere
 Solitary, I return from the night (2012), three songs for soprano and orchestra. Texts: David Vogel. Camerata Orchestra, Ariane Matiakh, cond. Tel Aviv, Jerusalem, Rehovot, October 2012. Premiere-
 Crystallization for large orchestra 2002), new version. Israeli Philharmonic orchestra, Zubin Mehta.cond. Tel Aviv, October 2012 
 Reminiscence for violin and piano. Moshe Aharonov, violin. Amit Dolberg, piano. "Nuovi Spazi Musicali" Festival, Rome. October 2012 
 At the Gate of Darkness for mezzo-soprano and ensemble. Ayelet Amotz, mezzo, Meitar Ensemble. Daniel Cohen, cond.  The Jerusalem International Chamber Music Festival. September 2012
 Encounters, for piano and two percussions players. Gili Luftos, piano. Lev Luftos and Dana Luftus, percussion. Jerusalem Music Center, May 2012. Premiere 
 Quintet, Piano& Ensemble. Ensemble Meitar, Guy Feder, cond.  Sounds of Israel Festival, Hamburg.; New Music Festival, Dresden. February 2012
 Quintet, Piano& Ensemble. Ensemble Meitar, Guy Feder, cond.  "Desert Sounds" Festival, Sde Boker. January 2012-
 Allegretto Misterioso for Two Pianos. Commissioned by Adele and John Gray Fund of AICF.  Yuval Admoni an Tami Kanazawa, pianos. Hateiva, – June 2011. Premiere
 Postlude, for a large ensemble. Meitar ensemble and guests. Einav Music Hall, Tel Aviv; Jerusalem Theatre. February 2011. Premiere-
 Two Pieces for Piano. Chag Hamusika, Tel Aviv Museum, October 2010
 Crystallisation for large orchestra. Rishon LeZion Orchestra, Ilan Volkov, cond.  May 2010. Premiere-
 Quintet, Piano& Ensemble. Ensemble Meitar.  Israel Music Conservatory Concert Series, Einav Hall Tel Aviv, January 2010. Premiere-
 Misterioso for piano. Amit Dolberg, piano.  Contemporary Music Festival, Latvia. October 2009;  Hateiva,Tel Aviv( as part of Trio Mouzar concert). June 2009
 At the Gate of Darkness, for mezzo-soprano, flute, clarinet, bassoon, violin, cello and piano; Meitar Ensemble. Hag Hamusika, Givataim Theatre. September 2009
 At the Gate of Darkness, Meitar Ensemble. Jerusalem Music Center; Hateiva, Tel Aviv. May 2009
 Reminiscence for violin and piano. Moshe Aharonov, violin. Amit Dolberg, piano. Hateiva. September 2008
 Misterioso for piano. Amit Dolberg, piano. Hateiva; Jerusalem Music Center. June 2008
 Shades .. to Colors for Piano and String Quartet (2003).  Meitar Ensemble. Musée d'art et d'histoire du Judaïsme, Paris. April 2008
 Shades .. to Colors; Tel Aviv Chamber Music Society. Einav Hall, Tel Aviv. March 2008
 Or Haganuz, for large ensemble; 21st Century Ensemble, Doron Salomon, cond. Hateiva; Jerusalem Music Center (Heritage Memorial Fund& America- Israel Cultural Fund. February 2008
 November  2007.- Circles in Time for fl, cl, vc, prc, pno; Nouvel Ensemble Moderne, Lorraine Vaillacourt, cond; Universite de Montreal. Contemporary Music Week
 Voyages for Orchestra. Revised version, Israeli Premiere. Israel Sinfonietta, Doron Solomon, cond. Hag Hamusika, Be'er Sheva September 2007
 At the Gate of Darkness for mezzo-soprano, fl, cl, bsn, vn, vc and pno. Synergy ensemble, Los Angeles. May 2007
 Misterioso for piano; Amit Dolberg, piano; Levontin 7, Tel Aviv. December 2006. 
 Reminiscence for Violin and Piano; Moshe Aharonov (violin) and Amit Dolberg (piano) .Biennale-Festival of New Music, opening concert, Tel Aviv Museum. November 2006
 Reminiscence for Violin and Piano; Moshe Aharonov and Amit Dolberg; ISAM Festival, Michelstadt, Germany. August 2006
 Dialogues for Piano and Chamber Ensemble. 21st Century Ensemble, Zsolt Nagy, cond.  Jerusalem Music Center; Tel Aviv Museum. June 2006
 At the Gate of Darkness, for mezzo-soprano, fl, cl, bsn, vn, vc and pno. Meitar Ensemble. Jerusalem Music Center; Einav Center, Tel Aviv. May 2006. Premiere
 Reminiscence for Violin and Piano. Assaf Levi and Amit Dolberg. March 2006. 
 Tempera, Finland-
 Helsinki Museum, Finland-
 Royal Academy, Stockholm-
 Yehudi Menuhin School, London -
 Jewish Museum, London-
 Guildhall Music School, London-
 Keel University, Keel, England-
 Ha'teiva, Tel Aviv-Yafo. Premiere -
 Shades ... to Colors for Piano and String Quartet (2003. Musica Nova Group. Felicia Blumenthal Hall, Tel Aviv; Ha'teiva. February 2006
 Circles in Time for fl, cl, vc, prc, pno. Kaprizma Ensemble; Jerusalem Music Center. June 2005- 
Poljak, piano; 2005 ISCM World Music Days, Zagreb; Matica Hrvatska Hall. April 2005 
Shades to Colors for piano and string quartet. Porin String Quartet, Srebrenka-
 Circles in Time; Musica Nova Ensemble, Constantia Gorcki, cond. Tel Aiv Museum. March 2004-
 Shades to Colors for piano and string quartet; Israel Contemporary String Quartet, Yuval Admoni, piano. Jerusalem Music Center. March 2003. Premiere-
 Voyages for orchestra; Bucharest Academy Orchestra, Dorel Pascu, cond. George Enescu Hall, Bucharest. March 2003
 Misterioso for piano; Jana Macharakova, piano. Contemporary Music Week, Martinu Hall, Prague. December 2002.
 Misterioso for piano; Bart Berman, piano. Felicia Blumenthal Hall, Tel Aviv.-
 Misterioso for piano. the 10th Festival-Biennial of New Music. Opperman Music Hall, Tallahassee. January 2001-
 Misterioso for piano. Ido Aiel, piano. Weiss Hall, Jerusalem. February 2000-       
 Voyages for orchestra. McGill University Chamber Orchestra .Stewart Grant, cond. Pollack Hall, Montreal. February 1999. Premiere
 Dialogues for piano and chamber ensemble; Johanna Sobkowska, piano. Festival-Biennial of New Music, Florida State University, Opperman Hall, Tallahassee. February 1999   
July 1998. Premiere Misterioso for piano; Daniel Wiessner, piano. Dvorak Museum, Prague-
Dialogues for piano and chamber ensemble. McGill Contemporary Music Ensemble Denys Bouliane, cond. Pollack Hall, Montreal. April 1998. Premiere
 Composition Recital,  Rubin Academy Concert Hall, Jerusalem, June 1995:- 
 String Quartet; "The Golden Strings" Quartet -
 Five Short Pieces for Clarinet; Liran Berman, clarinet-
 Three Songs for Women's Choir; members of the "Cantus" Choir-
 Two Pieces for Piano; Ayal Adler, piano

Discography

 Gate of Darkness, for mezzo-soprano and ensemble.in :"Ensemble Meitar, 2010"
 'REMISCENCE', works 2003–2009. Sponsored by the Israeli Composers' League
 Reminiscence for Violin and Piano, in: "Ensemble Meitar, 2008"
 Voyages for orchestra, in: "Music in Time", 2005, a publication of the Jerusalem Academy of Music and Dance
 Ayal Adler – 'WORKS 1997–1999'. Including: Misterioso; Voyages; Dialogues.  Sponsored by Jerusalem Municipality, Culture Department. Jerusalem, 2002

Articles
 "Tristan Murail and Spectral Music", Music in Time 2005, pp. 87–91*

Education
1986: Diploma in Piano, Jerusalem Conservatory of Music
1995: B.Mus in Composition, Jerusalem Academy of Music and Dance
1997: Artist Diploma in Composition (with Honors), Jerusalem Academy of Music and Dance
2002: Doctorate in Music Composition (DMA), McGill University

References

External links
 Personal website. http://www.ayaladler.com
 Ensemble Meitar. https://web.archive.org/web/20130426023724/http://www.meitar.net/content/ayal-adler
 Israeli Music Institute.  https://web.archive.org/web/20131004234235/http://www.imi.org.il/Composer.aspx?id=09fffbbf-5f6c-40db-9a95-235e2c90d5a4
 online compositions@Myspace four online compositions [ 5:48 ' 7:50 ' 11:22 and 10:55 minutes]
 Yossi Peles  at music forum

Israeli composers
Living people
1968 births
Composers from Jerusalem
McGill University School of Music alumni